The 2016 Highlands 101 was an endurance race staged at the Highlands Motorsport Park, near Cromwell, in Otago, New Zealand on 13 November 2016. It was the fourth running of the Highlands 101. It was also the final round of the Australian GT Championship.

The race was won by Michael Almond and Craig Baird, driving the Scott Taylor Motorsport-owned Mercedes-AMG GT3.

Official results

References

Highlands 101
Auto races in New Zealand